Basic is the sixth studio album by South Korean girl group Brown Eyed Girls, their first under their new label APOP Entertainment. It was released on November 5, 2015.

Reception
Basic was well-received critically, being praised by Billboard as "perfecting their [Brown Eyed Girls'] provocative formula".

Track listing

References

2015 albums
Korean-language albums
Brown Eyed Girls albums
Kakao M albums
Electropop albums
Dance-pop albums by South Korean artists